Makhdum Muhammad Ajmal (7 September 1919, Ludhiana, India – 1994) was an academic psychologist who established the first university psychology department in Pakistan. The psychologist Muhammad Asir Ajmal, who later served as head of this psychology department in university of USF, is his son.

Early life and education
Ajmal was the son of Masooda Begum Chishtie, from the old and famous scholarly Chishtie family of Lahore, and Khan Bahadur Makhdum Mohammad Afzal, district and sessions Judge. He was a year younger than his elder sister, Sarwai Begum (later Mrs Sarwari Chishtie). After his parents separated, Ajmal lived with his mother in Koocha Chabak Sawaranin the walled city of Lahore. His mother was a teacher and later headmistress of Mission Girls High School, Rung Mahal, Lahore. After matriculation Ajmal joined Government College, Lahore, the premier educational institution. He stood first in Masters examination in Philosophy and was awarded various Medals for this achievement. He worshipped his mother and following her footsteps and became a lecturer. He married Syeda Akhtar Sultana (d. 1999) who took great pride in her husband's achievements and stood by him like a rock through thick and thin.

Studying in United Kingdom

In the early years he was posted to various far off places in (pre-independence) India, later taught at Campbellpur (now Attock) and then his alma mater, Government College, Lahore. He went to England to do his PhD in Psychology, which he completed at University College, London. Amongst his supervisors & teachers were Professors Michael Fordham, J. C. Flugel and in particular, Gerhard Adler. He trained in Freudian and Jungian psychoanalysis, while working part-time for the BBC. His PhD thesis is titled 'Comparison of Jungian and Freudian Analysis'.
He wrote numerous plays for the BBC Urdu service and interviewed the famous A. S. Neill of Summerhill School.

Establishing Psychology Department in Pakistan

After returning from England, he was appointed lecturer in psychology in the department of Philosophy at Government College. Psychology was not recognised or established as a separate subject. This became his lifelong passion, to introduce and establish psychology in Pakistan, starting with the Government College Lahore. His efforts ultimately yielded results and a separate psychology department was established and he became its first head and professor. He established the first ever counselling center in Pakistan, in his department and established the Lahore Mental Health Society. His popularity increased due to his scholarship and charisma.Later, he was the driving force in establishing National Institute of Psychology, in Islamabad. This institute was later named after him to become Dr. Mohammad Ajmal National Institute of Psychology, and continues to this day as the most important centre of teaching and research related to Psychology in Pakistan. He was admired and loved by his students because of his enchanting teaching style. He was a quiet and reflective man but had great passion for all things human and psychological. His fame and popularity were heightened by his frequent appearances on radio and TV lectures and discussions. Many years after his death, his son Dr Muhammad Asir Ajmal became the head of GCU Psychology Department which had been set up by his late father.

Role in psychological warfare

He helped establish the psychological warfare department in the armed forces, was appointed full-time adviser/psychologist to the Bureau of National Reconstruction in the 1960s. In the 1970s he became Principal, Government College, something he dreamed of becoming just before his retirement, but was also appointed Director of Education and later became Vice chancellor, University of the Punjab, Lahore. In 1973, he became Secretary of Education, Pakistan. After retirement he was re-employed to become a member of the FPSC (Federal Public Service Commission)to reform senior civil services in Pakistan and later appointed its acting Chairman.
Even though he was Principal of Government College, Lahore for nearly three years, his era is remembered as a golden period in the history of the college. Following in the footsteps of great principals such as Dr. Nazir Ahmad, he actively supported the GC Dramatic Club, the GC Music Society and the Film Society.

Influence in writing

He wrote many books and articles, in national and international journals. Before his death in 1994, of sudden cardiac arrest, he had become an icon of scholarship, honesty and moral uprightness. He was considered one of the greatest and influential scholars of Pakistan and South Asia.
Within his lifetime, he achieved the colossal task of making psychology one of the most popular subjects in the country, establishing psychology departments in all colleges, universities and educational institutions. He was a humble man and never really saw himself as a famous icon, idealised by thousands. He also established the Center of Excellence, The National Institute of Psychology at Quaid-i-Azam University. After his death, the Government of Pakistan named it after him and it is now "Dr. Ajmal National Institute of Psychology. He participated in activities of UNESCO and was visiting professor at Chicago and later, the first Iqbal Professor at Heidelberg University. He was given the title of 'National Professor of Psychology'.

Islam-Marxism theory

Dr Ajmal was successfully able to combine three parallel streams in his thought, Islam, Marxism, Sufism and Liberalism. He believed in the individual's right to self-expression without any restrictions from religion, state or any other authority. He also believed in equality of human beings and was opposed to the feudal power structures in Pakistan. But above all he was a Sufi who believed that love of God can truly liberate man from the clutches of materialism and all the suffering that results from attachment.  It was due to such eclecticism that he was able to admire great personalities such as Frithjof Schuon, Iqbal, Mao Zedong and Rene Guenon simultaneously.  His love for Prophet Muhammad was intense and deep.  He believed in establishing a separate psychological construct for Muslim psyche and worked to establish a Muslim tradition of psychotherapy since the 1960s, based on Sufism.

Books
 Tehlili Nafsiyaat (Analytical Psychology)
 Muqaalaat-i-Ajmal (edited by Sheema Majeed)
 Everyday Psychology
 Nishat-i-falsafa (Translation of "Pleasures of Philosophy" by Will Durant)
 Suqraat (Socrates).

References

1919 births
1994 deaths
Pakistani psychologists
Sufi psychology
Academic staff of the Government College University, Lahore
Government College University, Lahore alumni
Vice-Chancellors of the University of the Punjab
20th-century psychologists